The 1930 Adelaide Carnival was the seventh edition of the Australian National Football Carnival, an Australian football interstate competition. It was held from 30 July to 9 August and was the second carnival to be hosted by the South Australia city of Adelaide.

All six states contested the carnival, which was staged as a full round-robin amongst the states. All fifteen matches were played at Adelaide Oval. For the third consecutive time, the carnival was won by Victoria, which was undefeated. South Australia, whose sole loss came against Victoria in the final match of the carnival, came second. Western Australia was third and New South Wales was fourth, after the former narrowly defeated the latter in the latter's final game – New South Wales' strong performances were considered the surprise of the tournament, and were put down to the inclusion for the first time in many years of Broken Hill-based players in the team. Queensland finished last, and was winless for the fourth time in four carnival appearances.

As often occurred at interstate carnivals, overuse of the ground and untimely rain resulted in the surface degenerating to a mudheap by the end of the carnival. Crowds were less than hoped, with the carnival making a loss of £200–300, which the ANFC put down to rain and the onset of the great depression. The carnival's leading goalkicker was Victoria's Bill Mohr, who kicked 35 goals, including 16 in one match against Queensland.

Squads 
Victoria

Western Australia

South Australia

Tasmania

New South Wales

Queensland

Results

Ladder

Goalkickers

References 

Australian rules interstate football
Adelaide Carnival, 1930
July 1930 sports events
August 1930 sports events